The Acarosporales are an order of fungi in the class Lecanoromycetes. Phylogenetic analyses conducted using the sequences of both the protein-coding gene RPB2 as well as nuclear ribosomal genes place this order within the subclass Acarosporomycetidae.

According to a recent (2020) survey of fungal classification, the Acarosporales contain two families: Acarosporaceae, with 11 genera and about 260 species, and Eigleraceae, with 1 genus and 2 species.

References

 
Lichen orders
Lecanoromycetes orders
Taxa named by Alexander Zahlbruckner
Taxa described in 1906